Research in Autism Spectrum Disorders is a peer-reviewed medical journal published by Elsevier. It covers applied topics pertaining to autism spectrum disorders. The founding editor-in-chief was Johnny Matson (Louisiana State University), who was succeeded by Sebastian Gaigg (City University London) in 2015. The journal is abstracted and indexed in the Social Sciences Citation Index and Current Contents/Social & Behavioral Sciences. According to the Journal Citation Reports, the journal has a 2012 impact factor of 2.907.

References

External links 
 

Elsevier academic journals
Psychiatry journals
Publications established in 2007
English-language journals
Monthly journals